Întorsura Buzăului is a town in Covasna County, Transylvania, Romania. It administers three villages: Brădet (Bredét), Floroaia (Virágospatak) and Scrădoasa.

Geography
The town is located in the southern part of the county, on the border with Brașov County, and lies on the left bank of the Buzău River. The town's name means Buzău's Turning in Romanian; it gets its name from being located near a large turn that the river takes. The river initially flows northwards, but takes a sudden turn towards the south-east near the town.

Due to its location, the town registers the lowest temperatures in Romania every year.

It is traversed by national road DN10, which links Brașov to Buzău. This road passes through the Carpathian Mountains and for most of its length follows the Buzău River.

Population 

At the 2011 Romanian census, the town had 7,319 inhabitants, of whom 7,265 were ethnic Romanians, 37 were ethnic Hungarians, and 12 ethnic Romani.

Demographic movement according to the censuses:

Local festival 
The Ciobănașul Annual Festival takes place in Întorsura Buzăului on the first Sunday of September and lasts for two days. At the festival, visitors come from the town and the surrounding villages, and even from other counties. In 2006, Romanian President Traian Băsescu attended the festival. During the festival the attendants can consume Romanian traditional foods and drinks and are entertained with Romanian folk music.

Natives
 Valeriu Bularca
 Gheorghe Tohăneanu

Gallery

Notes

Populated places in Covasna County
Localities in Transylvania
Towns in Romania
Monotowns in Romania